The 2018 Rochford District Council election took place on 3 May 2018 to elect members of Rochford District Council in England. This was on the same day as other local elections.

Results summary

Ward results

Downhall & Rawreth 

No Rochford Resident candidate as previous (-15.2).

Foulness & The Wakerings 

No UKIP candidate as previous (-32.0).

Hawkwell East

Hawkwell West

Hockley

Hockley & Ashingdon

Hullbridge 

No UKIP candidate as previous (-25.3).

Lodge 

No UKIP (-20.7), Labour (-11.3) or Liberal Democrat (-11.3) candidates as previous.

Roche North & Rural 

No UKIP (-30.6) or Liberal Democrat (-11.1) candidates as previous.

Roche South 

No UKIP candidate as previous (-29.5).

Sweyne Park & Grange 

No Rochford Resident candidate as previous (-32.5).

Trinity 

No UKIP candidate as previous (-37.7).

Wheatley 

No Independent candidate as previous (-38.9).

References

2018
2018 English local elections
2010s in Essex